Tidmarsh is an English surname. People with this surname include:

Christopher Tidmarsh, stage name Neil Christian, (born 1943), English pop singer
David Tidmarsh (1892–1944), Irish-born flying ace of the Royal Flying Corps during the First World War
Jay Tidmarsh Sir James Napier Tidmarsh (born 1932), Lord Lieutenant of Bristol from 1996 to 2007
John Tidmarsh (born 1928), British broadcaster and journalist with the BBC World Service
John Francis Tidmarsh (1824–1906), Irish-born soap and candle manufacturer of South Australia
J. Tidmarsh & Co, his company later owned by W. H. Burford
Vivian Tidmarsh, playwright, author of Is Your Honeymoon Really Necessary?

References